BXM may refer to:

 the IATA code for Batom Airport, Indonesia
 the ticker symbol for CBOE S&P 500 BuyWrite Index